Alan Sinclair Paterson (11 June 1928 – 8 May 1999) was a British track and field athlete who competed in the high jump. He was one of Europe's best high jumpers during the immediate post-World War II period. He was the champion at the European Athletics Championships in 1950 and was also silver medallist at the 1946 event. He won a silver medal for Scotland at the 1950 British Empire Games.

He was a two-time Olympic finalist in the event, having competed at the 1948 London Olympics and the 1952 Helsinki Olympics.

Career
Born in Glasgow, he rose to the top of the national scene by winning the 1946 Amateur Athletic Association junior title in  before taking the senior title at the AAA Championships. This made the 18-year-old Paterson the youngest ever medallist at the championships.

Adegboyega Adedoyin was the winner at the national championships in 1947, but Paterson set a British record in Glasgow that year with a clearance of  – a mark that ranked him third in the world that season and was the best of his career. Paterson was again beaten by a foreigner at the 1948 AAA championships, this time by Australian John Winter. With eight other jumpers achieving the same height, his placing was decided on count-back – the first time the rule, which takes into account previous missed heights, was used in Olympic competition.

He won his second and third AAA national titles in 1949 and 1950. He prevented runner-up Arne Åhman from extending Sweden's unbeaten run since 1938 and was the first non-Scandinavian to lift the title. That same year he represented his native Scotland at the 1950 British Empire Games. His Olympic rival John Winter was present and victorious, but Paterson's jump of  brought him a share of the silver medal alongside Nigeria's Joshua Majekodunmi (his first and only international medal for Scotland).

Paterson emigrated to Canada in 1951 and ceased national competition as a result. His final international appearance came at the 1952 Helsinki Olympics at the age of twenty four. He was no longer competitive among the elite at that event and failed to clear , ending his Olympic career with 24th-place finish. Following retirement from athletics, Paterson remained in Canada and died there at the age of seventy in Port Credit, Ontario.

International competitions

See also
List of European Athletics Championships medalists (men)

References

External links

1928 births
1999 deaths
Scottish male high jumpers
European Athletics Championships medalists
Commonwealth Games silver medallists for Scotland
Athletes (track and field) at the 1950 British Empire Games
Scottish emigrants to Canada
Sportspeople from Glasgow
Olympic athletes of Great Britain
Athletes (track and field) at the 1948 Summer Olympics
Athletes (track and field) at the 1952 Summer Olympics
Commonwealth Games medallists in athletics
People educated at Hutchesons' Grammar School
Medallists at the 1950 British Empire Games